Lü Yongdi (born 16 December 1993 in Dalian, Liaoning) is a Chinese football player.

Club career
In 2010, Lü Yongdi started his professional footballer career with Harbin Yiteng in the China League Two. In the 2011 China League Two campaign he would be part of the team that won the division and promotion into the second tier. He would go on to be a member of the squad as they moved up divisions and gained promotion to the Chinese Super League. He would eventually make his Super league debut for Harbin on 7 March 2014 in a game against Shandong Luneng Taishan, coming on as a substitute for Li Jiahe in the 46th minute.

In July 2017, Lü was loaned to China League Two club Jilin Baijia until 31 December 2017.

After the relegation of Yiteng in 2018 Lü was transferred to Shanxi Metropolis and to Xi'an UKD in 2019.

Career statistics 
Statistics accurate as of match played 31 December 2020.

Honours

Club
Harbin Yiteng
 China League Two: 2011

References

External links
LÜ YONGDI at Soccerway.com

1993 births
Living people
Chinese footballers
Footballers from Dalian
Zhejiang Yiteng F.C. players
Chinese Super League players
China League One players
Association football midfielders